Biathlon at the 1996 Asian Winter Games took place in the city of Harbin, China with six events contested — three for men and three for women. The women's biathlon events were introduced in this edition of the Winter Asiad.

Medalists

Men

Women

Medal table

References
 

 
1996 Asian Winter Games events
1996
Asian Games